Elena Andreyevna Rybakina (born 17 June 1999) is a Kazakhstani professional tennis player. She is the reigning champion at Wimbledon and the first Kazakhstani player to win a title at a major. She is also the first to be ranked in the world's top 10, with a career-high ranking of No. 7 by the Women's Tennis Association (WTA), and the current Kazakhstani No. 1 player in women's singles. Rybakina has reached nine other finals on the WTA Tour (including three at the WTA 500 level), winning three further titles, including her maiden WTA 1000 title at the 2023 Indian Wells Masters.

Rybakina had a career-high combined junior ranking of No. 3, only beginning to have significant results relatively late in her junior career at the age of 17. She reached two junior Grand Slam semifinals, and won a Grade-A title at the Trofeo Bonfiglio in 2017. Born and playing as a Russian, Rybakina switched federations to Kazakhstan in June 2018, having just entered the top 200 for the first time a month earlier. Prior to the switch, she did not have an individual coach as a junior, and did not hire a traveling coach until early 2019. Her first consistent success on the WTA Tour came in mid-2019 and was highlighted by her first WTA title at the Bucharest Open as well as her top 100 debut. Rybakina made a breakthrough in the 2020 season, during which she led the tour with five finals, including four in her first five events of the year.

Rybakina is noted for her excellent serve and can generate high-powered groundstrokes. She plays primarily from the baseline and has good movement for her height.

Early life and background
Elena Rybakina was born on 17 June 1999 in Moscow. She started playing sports with her older sister from a very young age, originally focusing on gymnastics and ice skating. Upon being told that she was too tall to become a professional in either of those sports, her father suggested she switch to tennis instead because of his interest in the sport. Rybakina began playing tennis at the age of six.

Rybakina moved from the Dynamo Sports Club to the Spartak Tennis Club, where she had several accomplished coaches. She trained with former top-10 player Andrey Chesnokov and former top-100 player Evgenia Kulikovskaya. One of her fitness coaches was Irina Kiseleva, a World Championship gold medalist in the modern pentathlon.

Rybakina did not have individual training until she was a junior, instead practicing in a group of about eight players up until age 15 and a group of four players through age 18. She also only played tennis about two hours per day and trained in fitness for three hours a day. Her time for tennis was limited in part because she attended a regular high school not specialized for athletes and needed to balance tennis with schoolwork.

Junior career

Rybakina is a former world No. 3 junior. She began playing on the ITF Junior Circuit in November 2013 at the age of 14. The following March, she won her first title at her second career event, the Grade-3 Almetievsk Cup. She played her first Grade-2 event in June at the Ozerov Cup in Moscow, finishing runner-up to compatriot Anna Blinkova. She began playing Grade-1 events from the start of 2015, but did not have any success until she reached the final at the Belgian International Junior Championships in May, losing to Katharina Hobgarski.

Rybakina made her junior-Grand Slam debut later in the year at the US Open, where she reached the third round. Following an opening-round loss at the 2016 Australian Open, she won back-to-back Grade-1 titles. She continued to struggle at the junior Grand Slam and other Grade-A events in singles for the rest of the year. Her best result of 2016 at the Grade A-events came in doubles when she finished runner-up to Olesya Pervushina and Anastasia Potapova at the Trofeo Bonfiglio, alongside Amina Anshba in an all-Russian final.

The 2017 season was Rybakina's last year on the junior tour. In the middle of the season, she won her first and only Grade-A title at the Trofeo Bonfiglio, defeating Iga Świątek in the final. She also fared better at the Grand Slam events compared to previous years, losing in the semifinals of the Australian Open and the French Open to eventual champions Marta Kostyuk and Whitney Osuigwe, respectively. She finished her junior career at the first round-robin edition of the ITF Junior Masters, the junior counterpart to the WTA Finals. She won one match in her round-robin group and finished in seventh place.

Professional career

2014–18: First ITF titles, national change
Rybakina began playing on the ITF Women's Circuit in December 2014, at the age of 15. While she was still playing on the junior circuit, she reached three ITF finals in singles and two in doubles, winning both of the doubles finals only in 2017. She also made her WTA Tour debut in October 2017 at the Kremlin Cup, where she reached the main draw through qualifying but lost in the opening round to Irina-Camelia Begu.

At her next WTA tournament in February 2018, Rybakina won her first WTA Tour match at the St. Petersburg Trophy against Timea Bacsinszky. She then upset world No. 7, Caroline Garcia, in three sets, after saving a match point in the second set. Losing in the next round, this quarterfinal appearance helped her rise from No. 450 to No. 268 in the world. In March, Rybakina won her first ITF singles title at a $15k event in Kazan, where she also won the doubles title.
Her next significant rankings jump came in April when she finished runner-up to Sabina Sharipova at the $60k Lale Cup in Istanbul, bringing her to No. 215. She broke into the top 200 for the first time in late May. The following month, Rybakina acquired Kazakhstani citizenship and switched federations from Russia to Kazakhstan, having just turned 19 years old at the time. The Kazakhstan Tennis Federation had offered her financial support to change her nationality, which she chose over various options to play college tennis in the United States.

Playing for Kazakhstan, Rybakina entered her first Grand Slam qualifying draw at the US Open, but did not reach the main draw.

2019: First tour title and top 50

After playing mostly ITF events in the first half of 2019, Rybakina began playing primarily on the WTA Tour in the second half of the season. During the first few months of the year, she won three ITF titles, including the $60k Launceston International. She made her Grand Slam debut at the French Open as a qualifier, losing to Kateřina Siniaková. In her first WTA event on grass, Rybakina made her first semifinal at the Rosmalen Grass Court Championships. Despite this success, she lost in qualifying at Wimbledon. Rybakina's breakthrough came in July when she won her maiden WTA Tour title at the Bucharest Open, a month after turning 20 years old. During the event, she upset second seed Viktória Kužmová before defeating Patricia Maria Țig in the final. With this title, she made her top 100 debut in the WTA rankings at No. 65.

Rybakina qualified for her second main-draw Grand Slam match of the year at the US Open, but again lost in the first round. At her next tournament, she made her second WTA Tour tournament final of the year at the Jiangxi International Open, finishing runner-up to Rebecca Peterson. This result brought her into the top 50 for the first time. Rybakina closed out the year strong, reaching at least the quarterfinals at her last three events of the season. In particular, she reached the quarterfinals at the Wuhan Open, her first career Premier-5 event. In the tournament, she defeated world No. 6, Simona Halep, who retired late in the first set with a lower back injury. She lost in the next round to eventual champion and world No. 14, Aryna Sabalenka. Rybakina finished the season at No. 37 in the world.

2020: Five finals and top 20
Rybakina led the WTA Tour in finals during the 2020 season, and finished tied for second in match wins. She reached the finals at four of her first five events. Before the COVID-19 pandemic led to the shutdown of the WTA Tour for more than five months, she had reached the final of every tournament bar the Australian Open and the Qatar Open, losing to world No. 1, Ashleigh Barty, in both instances, the latter in a walkover due to an abductor strain in her leg. Prior to the Australian Open, her two finals came at International events. After losing her first final of the year to Ekaterina Alexandrova at the Shenzhen Open, she defeated Zhang Shuai to win her second WTA title at the Hobart International. At Melbourne, she recorded her first two Grand Slam main-draw match wins against Bernarda Pera and Greet Minnen. Following the tournament, she reached two Premier finals at the St. Petersburg Trophy and the Dubai Championships, finishing runner-up to No. 8 Kiki Bertens and No. 2 Simona Halep, respectively. At Dubai in particular, Rybakina defeated two top-ten players in No. 7 Sofia Kenin and No. 3 Karolína Plíšková, the latter of which was the highest ranked player she had defeated to date. These four finals helped her climb to No. 17 in the world at the time of the tour shutdown. She also became the first Kazakhstani player in the top 20 in history.

During the bulk of the shutdown, Rybakina stayed in Moscow and did not have the opportunity to practice for two and a half months. She eventually resumed training in Bratislava, Slovakia for five weeks. When the tour resumed in New York in August, she lost her return match to Alexandrova and then only recorded one match win at the US Open. Back in Europe, she finally defeated Alexandrova at the Italian Open in her third opportunity of the year before squandering a chance to serve out the match in a third-round loss to Yulia Putintseva. At the Internationaux de Strasbourg, Rybakina reached her fifth final of the year and first since the resumption of the tour, losing in the final to No. 5, Elina Svitolina. She did not carry this success to the next major, losing to Fiona Ferro in the second round at the French Open.

2021: French Open quarterfinals and historic top 15
She reached the quarterfinals of the French Open without dropping a set when she defeated Serena Williams in the fourth round. At the same tournament, she also reached the quarterfinals in doubles, partnering Anastasia Pavlyuchenkova; incidentally, Pavlyuchenkova was the opponent who defeated her in the quarterfinals of the singles portion of the 2021 French Open.

Rybakina was the 15th seed of the Olympic Games tennis tournament, winning her first three matches without losing a set before a semifinals defeat to Belinda Bencic. In the bronze medal match, Rybakina was defeated in a comeback by Elina Svitolina.

On 1 November 2021, she made her debut in the top 15, at world No. 14, becoming the highest ranked Kazakhstani player in history.

2022: Wimbledon title, career-high ranking 

Rybakina started the season at the Adelaide International 1, making it to the final where she was defeated by world No. 1, Ashleigh Barty. Her success continued at the Sydney Tennis Classic with a lopsided defeat of reigning US Open champion Emma Raducanu, in the first round. She subsequently withdrew from the tournament citing a thigh injury. She reached a career-high ranking of No. 12, on 17 January 2022. 

Her remaining early hardcourt season saw little progress with a second-round retirement and a walkover at the Australian Open and St. Petersburg Ladies' Trophy, respectively, and a first-round loss at the Qatar Open. Her "Sunshine Double" (Miami and Indian Wells) saw improvement with a quarterfinal appearance at the Indian Wells Open against Maria Sakkari and a third-round appearance to Jessica Pegula at the Miami Open.

Her clay-court season began with a second-round loss to Anhelina Kalinina after a first-round bye at Charleston. Following this, she represented Kazakhstan as the team's top seed and won both of her singles matches in a tie against Germany securing a berth in the finals later in the year. The remainder of her clay-court season saw little achievement as she failed to advance into the quarterfinals at the Stuttgart Open, Madrid Open, Italian Open, and French Open.

Rybakina's grass-court season in the lead up to Wimbledon saw a second-round loss to Shelby Rogers at the Rosmalen Open followed by a first-round bye and a second-round loss to Lesia Tsurenko at the Eastbourne International. At the Wimbledon Championships, she reached her second Grand Slam quarterfinal, defeating CoCo Vandeweghe, Bianca Andreescu, Zheng Qinwen and Petra Martić. Then she reached the semifinals at a major for the first time, defeating Ajla Tomljanović in her quarterfinal match. She became the first Kazakhstani singles player (male or female) to reach the semifinal of a Grand Slam. Then she reached her first major final, after defeating Simona Halep in straight sets, becoming the youngest Wimbledon finalist since Garbiñe Muguruza in 2015. After dropping the first set, she defeated Ons Jabeur in three sets to secure her first major title. She became the youngest woman champion since the 21-year-old Petra Kvitová in 2011. She was the fourth-youngest active major champion, older only than Iga Świątek, Bianca Andreescu and Emma Raducanu. Rybakina's birth in Russia and previous international representation of Russia became a matter of public discourse in the aftermath of her success at Wimbledon 2022, where Wimbledon had banned athletes representing Russia and Belarus due to Russia's invasion of Ukraine.

The North American hardcourt season began with early round losses at the Silicon Valley Classic (first round) and Canadian Open (second round). Her US Open preparations continued at the Cincinnati Open where she advanced to the quarterfinals and was defeated by Madison Keys. Her season continued next with an entry to the US Open as the 25th seed; however, she lost in the first round to qualifier Clara Burel.

2023: Australian Open final, Indian Wells champion, wins against world No. 1, top 10

Rybakina started the season at the Adelaide International 1, defeating Danielle Collins in three sets before losing to Marta Kostyuk in the second round. She followed it by another loss in Adelaide International 2 to Petra Kvitová in straight sets. However, she reached the doubles final with partner Anastasia Pavlyuchenkova. 
At the Australian Open, Rybakina defeated 2022 finalist Danielle Collins again in the third round, world No. 1 Iga Świątek in the fourth round, and former French Open champion Jelena Ostapenko in the quarterfinals to reach her first Australian Open semifinals. In the semifinals, she defeated former world No. 1 and two-time Australian Open champion Victoria Azarenka in straight sets, reaching the second Grand Slam final of her career. However, despite winning the first set, Rybakina ultimately lost in the championship match to Aryna Sabalenka in a high quality encounter. She reached the top 10 on 30 January 2023.

In Abu Dhabi she reached the quarterfinals defeating Karolina Plíšková, where she lost to Beatriz Haddad Maia.

In Dubai, she reached the third round by beating Bianca Andreescu and Marie Bouzková in straight sets. She withdrew from her third round match against Coco Gauff due to a lower-back injury.

At Indian Wells, as 10th seed, she made second consecutive Indian Wells quarterfinals after defeating Sofia Kenin, 21st seed Paula Badosa and Varvara Gracheva. Then she defeated Karolína Muchová to reach her first WTA 1000 semifinal. In the semifinals, she blasted past the defending champion and World No. 1 Iga Świątek in straight sets, for the second time in 2023 to made first WTA 1000 final. In the final, she edged second seed Aryna Sabalenka in straight sets, reversing the result of their matchup in the Australian Open final for her first WTA 1000 title.  This result pushed her ranking to a new career-high of #7 in the WTA Rankings.

Playing style

With a powerful serve, Rybakina is an aggressive baseliner who aims to finish points quickly, and whose high risk game style leads to an accumulation of both winners and unforced errors. She can generate effortless power, both on groundstrokes and her serve. Her forehand and backhand are both hit flat, with relentless depth and speed, allowing her to generate excellent power with both her groundstrokes, and she can hit winners with both shots. Her powerful serve, which is capable of reaching , allows her to serve a large number of aces, and she led the tour in the ace count in 2020, serving 192 aces throughout the year. Due to her doubles experience, Rybakina aims to finish points at the net, and is a capable volleyer. She also has good movement given her height, although this is one of the few weak areas in her game. Adriano Albanesi, a WTA coach, described her as "a right-handed [Petra] Kvitová". Rybakina plays with a very calm demeanor, and believes she can defeat any opponent. Early in her WTA career, she has excelled at three-set matches, winning 13 out of 14 from September 2019 through February 2020.

Coaches
Rybakina hired Andrei Chesnokov, whom she had already trained with at Spartak Tennis Club, to be her private coach in 2018 at the age of 18. This was the first time she had an individual coach. Chesnokov only coached in Moscow and did not travel with her to tournaments. In February 2019, Rybakina switched coaches to Stefano Vukov, a Croatian former tennis player who briefly competed mainly on the ITF Futures tour. With Vukov as her first travelling coach, Rybakina rapidly improved, rising from just inside the top 200 of the WTA rankings into the top 30 in about a year.

Endorsements
Rybakina has been sponsored by Adidas for clothing and shoes since the start of 2020. She had previously been endorsed by Nike. She uses a Yonex VCore 100 racket.

On January 24, 2023, Rybakina began to cooperate with the Kazakhstan Bank RBK.

Career statistics

Grand Slam tournament performance timelines

Singles

Doubles

Note: Rybakina switched federations from Russia to Kazakhstan in June 2018.

Grand Slam tournament finals

Singles: 2 (1 title, 1 runner-up)

Awards
 Order of Friendship (Kazakhstan) II degree

References

External links

 

1999 births
Living people
Tennis players from Moscow
Kazakhstani female tennis players
Russian female tennis players
Russian emigrants to Kazakhstan
Naturalised citizens of Kazakhstan
Naturalised tennis players
Kazakhstani people of Russian descent
Olympic tennis players of Kazakhstan
Tennis players at the 2020 Summer Olympics